Nicolas Hislen (born February 11, 1983) is a French professional football player. Currently, he plays in the Ligue 2 for AC Arles-Avignon.

External links

1983 births
Living people
French footballers
Ligue 1 players
Ligue 2 players
AS Monaco FC players
FC Lorient players
FC Martigues players
AC Arlésien players
Expatriate footballers in Monaco
French expatriate sportspeople in Monaco
Association football midfielders
People from Chaumont, Haute-Marne
Sportspeople from Haute-Marne
Footballers from Grand Est